Lake Llamacocha (possibly from Quechua llama llama, qucha lake) is a lake in the Andes of Peru. It is located in the Ancash Region, Pallasca Province, Conchucos District, northeast of Conchucos.

References 

Lakes of Peru
Lakes of Ancash Region